A copier or photocopier is a machine for producing paper duplicates of documents and images.

Copier may also refer to:
Mettin Copier, a footballer currently playing for Dayton Dutch Lions
Game backup device
Slide copier, a device for duplicating photographic slides

See also
List of duplicating processes